In statistics, Bartlett's test, named after Maurice Stevenson Bartlett, is used to test homoscedasticity, that is, if multiple samples are from populations with equal variances. Some statistical tests, such as the analysis of variance, assume that variances are equal across groups or samples, which can be verified with Bartlett's test.

In a Bartlett test, we construct the null and alternative hypothesis. For this purpose several test procedures have been devised. The test procedure due to M.S.E (Mean Square Error/Estimator) Bartlett test is represented here. This test procedure is based on the statistic whose sampling distribution is approximately a Chi-Square distribution with (k − 1) degrees of freedom, where k is the number of random samples, which may vary in size and are each drawn from independent normal distributions.
Bartlett's test is sensitive to departures from normality. That is, if the samples come from non-normal distributions, then Bartlett's test may simply be testing for non-normality. Levene's test and the Brown–Forsythe test are alternatives to the Bartlett test that are less sensitive to departures from normality.

Specification
Bartlett's test is used to test the null hypothesis, H0 that all k population variances are equal against the alternative that at least two are different.

If there are k samples with sizes  and sample variances  then Bartlett's test statistic is

The test statistic has approximately a  distribution. Thus, the null hypothesis is rejected if  (where  is the upper tail critical value for the  distribution).

Bartlett's test is a modification of the corresponding likelihood ratio test designed to make the approximation to the  distribution better (Bartlett, 1937).

Notes
The test statistics may be written in some sources with logarithms of base 10 as:

See also
 Box's M test
 Levene's test
 Kaiser–Meyer–Olkin test

References

External links
 NIST page on Bartlett's test

Analysis of variance
Statistical tests